Porsche Carrera Cup (sometimes abbreviated PCC) is a number of one-make racing by Porsche premier series competed with, initially Porsche 911 Carrera Cup, then later Porsche 911 GT3 Cup cars. The cars are specifically built by Porsche for one-make racing, with each vehicle identical to those of its generation.

There are three distinct tiers of racing, the top tier is the Porsche Supercup. Today the Supercup races as part of the support program of the FIA Formula 1 World Championship on most, if not all, of the Grands Prix held in Europe, and occasionally Grands Prix in Asia and North America. Established in 1993, it is the most prestigious one-make series for GT cars.

The second tier are the national Carrera Cups, held in Australia, France, Germany, Italy, Japan and the United Kingdom as well as International Carrera Cups held across multiple nations in eastern Asia and in the Scandinavian nations of Denmark, Finland, Norway and Sweden. The longest running is the Porsche Carrera Cup Germany, which was also the original series, first held in 1986 using the Porsche 964 Cup racing car. Now in its 36th year it has been one of the world's best known Pro-Am GT series and helped to progress many future World Endurance Champions, Le Mans winners and today is the primary feeder for the Porsche Supercup with many racing teams contesting both series. The Porsche Carrera Cup France began just a year later in 1987. The early 2000s saw a proliferation of Carrera Cups with Great Britain, Australia, Asia and Scandinavia all starting in a four-year burst with Italy following in 2007.
 
The third tier is the Porsche GT3 Cup Challenge or Porsche GT3 Cup Trophy, recently renamed in some markets as the Porsche Sprint Challenge. This is a mixture of smaller series in Europe, Switzerland based series, Benelux series held across Belgium, the Netherlands and Luxembourg, a Central European series, a Middle East series in the Gulf States, as well as larger series in the Americas; United States, Brazil and Argentina. As well as New Zealand and some which act as a second tier series within Carrera Cup nations. Some GT3 Cup Challenge series will use older Carrera Cup cars from previous generations of the Porsche 911. New Zealand and Australian GT3 Cup Challenges use second hand cars from Carrera Cup Australia series as an example, although largers series, particularly United States and Brazil are effectively Carrera Cups. GT3 Cup Trophies are essentially second tier GT3 Cup Challenges. Superseded Carrera Cup and GT3 Cup Cars have also become popular cars to race in domestic GT series on five continents.

Dutch racer Patrick Huisman is the most successful Carrera Cup racer having won four Supercups consecutively between 1997 and 2000. German driver René Rast won three Supercups (2010–12) and two German Carrera Cups (2008 & 2012). Dominique Dupuy won the French Carrera Cup five times between 1992 and 1999 and New Zealander Craig Baird won the Australian Carrera Cup five times between 2006 and 2013. Christophe Bouchut won the French Carrera Cup four times around Dupuy's five titles, the two dominating the French series for a decade. Dutch driver Larry ten Voorde is currently the defending champion of the Porsche Supercup.

The one-make GT series model has also been used for other Porsche models, usually the entry level Porsche of the time, 924, 944, 968 and Boxster and has proliferated to other manufacturers as well; Ferrari Challenge, Lamborghini Super Trofeo, Trofeo Maserati, Audi R8 LMS Cup, Lotus Cup, MGF Trophy and a multitude of series based on the Mazda MX-5.

Championships

International
Porsche Supercup
Porsche Carrera World Cup
International Race of Champions USA (IROC I)

Carrera Cup
Porsche Carrera Cup Asia
Porsche Carrera Cup Australia
Porsche Carrera Cup Benelux
Porsche Carrera Cup Brasil
Porsche Carrera Cup France
Porsche Carrera Cup Germany
Porsche Carrera Cup Great Britain
Porsche Carrera Cup Italy
Porsche Carrera Cup Japan 
Porsche Carrera Cup Scandinavia
Porsche Carrera Cup North America

Sprint Challenge
Porsche Sprint Challenge Australia
Porsche Sprint Challenge Brasil
Porsche GT3 Cup Challenge Central Europe
Porsche GT3 Cup Challenge Eastern Europe
Porsche GT3 Cup Challenge Finland
Porsche Sprint Challenge Great Britain
Porsche Sprint Challenge Japan
Porsche Sprint Challenge Middle East
Porsche GT3 Cup Challenge New Zealand
Porsche Sprint Challenge North America
Porsche GT3 Cup Challenge Suisse
Porsche GT3 Cup Trophy Argentina
Porsche GT3 Cup Trophy China
Porsche GT3 Cup Trophy Chile

Champions

See also
Audi R8 LMS Cup
Ferrari Challenge
Lamborghini Super Trofeo

References

External links

 
  (Asia, Australia, Deutschland, France, Great Britain, Italia, Japan, Scandinavia)

 
Stock car racing